Arsenic trichloride is an inorganic compound with the formula AsCl3, also known as arsenous chloride or butter of arsenic.  This poisonous oil is colourless, although impure samples may appear yellow.  It is an intermediate in the manufacture of organoarsenic compounds.

Structure
AsCl3 is a pyramidal molecule with C3v symmetry.  The As-Cl bond is 2.161 Å and the angle Cl-As-Cl is 98° 25'±30.  AsCl3 has four normal modes of vibration: ν1(A1) 416, ν2(A1) 192, ν3 393, and ν4(E) 152 cm−1.

Synthesis
This colourless liquid is prepared by treatment of arsenic(III) oxide with hydrogen chloride followed by distillation:
 As2O3 +  6 HCl  →  2 AsCl3  + 3 H2O

It can also be prepared by chlorination of arsenic at 80–85 °C, but this method requires elemental arsenic.
 2 As +  3 Cl2   →   2 AsCl3
Arsenic trichloride can be prepared by the reaction of arsenic oxide and sulfur monochloride. This method requires simple apparatus and proceeds efficiently:
 2 As2O3  +  6 S2Cl2   →   4 AsCl3  +  3 SO2  +  9 S
A convenient laboratory method is refluxing arsenic(III) oxide with thionyl chloride:
 2 As2O3 +  3 SOCl2   →   2 AsCl3 +  3 SO2
Arsenic trichloride can also be prepared by the reaction of hydrochloric acid and arsenic(III) sulfide.

As2S3 + 6 HCl   →  2 AsCl3 + 3 H2S

Reactions
Hydrolysis gives arsenous acid and hydrochloric acid:
 AsCl3 + 3 H2O  →  As(OH)3 + 3 HCl
Although AsCl3 is less moisture sensitive than PCl3, it still fumes in moist air.

AsCl3 undergoes redistribution upon treatment with As2O3 to give the inorganic polymer AsOCl. With chloride sources, AsCl3, forms salts containing the anion [AsCl4]−. Reaction with potassium bromide and potassium iodide give arsenic tribromide and arsenic triiodide, respectively.

AsCl3 is useful in organoarsenic chemistry, for example triphenylarsine is derived from AsCl3:
AsCl3  +  6 Na  + C6H5Cl   → As(C6H5)3  +  6 NaCl

The poison gases called Lewisites are prepared by the addition of arsenic trichloride to acetylene:

Safety
Inorganic arsenic compounds are highly toxic, and AsCl3 especially so because of its volatility and solubility (in water). 

It is classified as an extremely hazardous substance in the United States as defined in Section 302 of the U.S. Emergency Planning and Community Right-to-Know Act (42 U.S.C. 11002), and is subject to strict reporting requirements by facilities which produce, store, or use it in significant quantities.

References

Arsenic(III) compounds
Arsenic halides
Chlorides